Eugene Thomas may refer to:

 Eugene Thomas (murder victim) (died 1994), New Zealand murder victim
 Eugène Thomas (1903–1969), French politician

See also
 Gene Thomas (disambiguation)